The National Identity Bloc in Europe, abbreviated to BINE, is a nationalist electoral alliance in Romania currently formed by two political parties: the Greater Romania Party (PRM) and Noua Dreaptă (PND). The United Romania Party (PRU), one of the founding members of the alliance, was part of it until its dissolution in 2019.

See also
 New Generation Party (Romania)

References

2017 establishments in Romania
Conservative parties in Romania
Eurosceptic parties in Romania
Far-right political parties in Romania
National conservative parties
Nationalist parties in Romania
Political parties established in 2017
Political party alliances in Romania
Right-wing populist parties
Romanian nationalist parties
Social conservative parties
Right-wing parties in Romania